Francis B. Nyamnjoh (born 1961) is a Cameroonian Professor of Social Anthropology at the University of Cape Town.  He was recipient of the annual "ASU African Hero 2013" award from the African Students Union at Ohio University, the 2014 Eko Prize for African Literature, and his book #RhodesMustFall: Nibbling at Resilient Colonialism in South Africa won the 2018 ASAUK Fage & Oliver Prize for the best monograph.

Early life and education 
Francis B. Nyamnjoh was born in 1961 in Bum, Cameroon. He obtained his Bachelor of Arts (1984) and Master of Arts (1985) from the University of Yaoundé in Cameroon. His master's thesis was titled Change in the concept of power amongst the Bum. He earned a Doctor of Philosophy from the University of Leicester, in 1990.

Career and research 
Nyamnjoh moved from the Council for the Development of Social Science Research in Africa (CODESRIA), where he held the position of Head of Publications from July 2003 to July 2009, to the University of Cape Town in August 2009 to take up a position as Professor of Social Anthropology.
 
He has conducted considerable study and written extensively about Cameroon, Botswana, and generally african politics. He has taught sociology, anthropology, and communication studies at universities in Cameroon and Botswana. According to the South African National Research Foundation, he is a professor and researcher with a B1 rating (NRF). He is the Chair of the Editorial Board of Langaa Research and Publishing Center in Bamenda (2005) and has served as Editorial Board Chair for the South African Human Sciences Research Council (HSRC) Press (2011-2019).

#RhodesMustFall 
Nyamnjoh books include #RhodesMustFall: Nibbling at Resilient Colonialism in South Africa, This book, which is built on his previous book Insiders and outsiders: Citizenship and xenophobia in contemporary Southern Africa (2005), is a book on citizenship, rights, and entitlements in post-apartheid South Africa demonstrates how racism and its advantages still exist and that the field has not been levelled as some have assumed. It examines the issue of race in a culture still troubled by the lingering effects of apartheid, inequality, and attitudes of inferiority and inadequacy among the majority black population via the regular interactions and experiences of university students and lecturers where due to the ongoing renewal and addition of circles of privilege to a complex and long history of the growth of black sorrow, black voices and concerns in education are usually ignored. These problems are discussed against the backdrop of organised student protests that are roiling the nation's campuses and calling for change under the banner of "Black Lives Matter." This thorough examination of the Rhodes Must Fall campaign raises interesting concerns regarding the benefits and drawbacks of exclusionary definitions of belonging due to its multifaceted complexity. What might the modern quick-footed makwerekwere from Africa north of the Limpopo possible have in common with the big imperialist of the past like the stripling Uitlander or foreigner Sir Cecil John Rhodes? According to Nyamnjoh, the solution lies in how human movement constantly pushes the limits of citizenship.

Awards and honours 
Nyamnjoh received the "Senior Arts Researcher of the Year" award in 2003. Nyamnjoh was given the University of Cape Town Excellence Award in October 2012 in recognition of his "exceptional contribution as a professor in the Faculty of Humanities", an award renewed in 2017 and again in 2022. In September 2021, he was elected as a fellow by the College of Fellows of the University of Cape Town, in recognition of his research. #RhodesMustFall: Nibbling at Resilient Colonialism in South Africa won the 2018 ASAUK Fage & Oliver Prize for the best monograph, he was recipient of the annual "ASU African Hero 2013" award from the African Students Union at Ohio University, the 2014 Eko Prize for African Literature .
 
Nyamnjoh was elected a Fellow of the Cameroon Academy of Science in 2011, the African Academy of Sciences in 2014, and a fellow of the Academy of Science of South Africa in 2016.

Selected publications 
 
 Africa’s Media, Democracy and the Politics of Belonging (2005)
 Insiders and Outsiders: Citizenship and Xenophobia in Contemporary Southern Africa (2006)
 The Disillusioned African (2007)
 “C'est l'homme qui fait l'homme”: Cul-de-Sac Ubuntu-ism in Côte d'Ivoire (2015)
 #RhodesMustFall: Nibbling at Resilient Colonialism in South Africa (2016)
 Drinking from the Cosmic Gourd: How Amos Tutuola Can Change Our Minds (2017)
 Eating and Being Eaten: Cannibalism as Food for Thought (2018)
 The Rational Consumer: Bad for Business and Politics: Democracy at the Crossroads of Nature and Culture (2018)

Notes

References

External links 
 
 Francis B. Nyamnjoh: #RhodesMustFall, Youtube
 A Case for Convivial Scholarship: Inspiration from #RhodesMustFall by Prof Francis B Nyamnjoh, Youtube
 ALA 2020-2021 Lecture Series: Francis B. Nyamnjoh, Youtube
 Francis Nyamnjoh: 'Cecil John Rhodes: The Uitlander and Makwerekwere with a Missionary Zeal', Youtube

Fellows of the African Academy of Sciences
African academics
African writers
Living people
1961 births
Alumni of the University of Leicester